Chenopodium hians is a species of flowering plant in the family Amaranthaceae known by the common names hians goosefoot and gaping goosefoot. The Latin species name hians means "gaping".

Distribution
It is native to much of the western half of North America from British Columbia to California to Texas, where it grows in many types of open habitat, moist and dry, including disturbed areas such as roadsides.

Description
This is an annual herb growing an erect, branching stem up 80 centimeters in maximum height. It is powdery in texture, especially on the leaves and flowers. The leaves are up to 3 centimeters long, oval to lance-shaped with smooth edges. The inflorescence is a spike or panicle a few centimeters long made up of several clusters of tightly packed tiny flowers. Each flower has five lobes and coats the developing fruit.

References

External links
Calflora Database: Chenopodium hians (gaping goosefoot,  hians goosefoot)
USDA Plants Profile for Chenopodium hians (hians goosefoot)
Jepson Manual eFlora (TJM2) treatment of Chenopodium hians
Flora of North America

hians
Flora of the Western United States
Flora of British Columbia
Flora of California
Flora of Texas
Flora of the Rocky Mountains
Flora of the Sierra Nevada (United States)
Natural history of the California chaparral and woodlands
Natural history of the Transverse Ranges
Flora without expected TNC conservation status